Amata marella  is a species of moth of the family Erebidae first described by Arthur Gardiner Butler in 1876. It is found in Australia, where it has been recorded from Queensland.

References 

marella
Moths described in 1876
Moths of Australia